Malakichthys is a genus of fish in the family Acropomatidae, the temperate ocean-basses or lanternfishes. They are native to the Indian Ocean and the western Pacific Ocean.

Fish of this genus are characterized by their small villiform teeth, 3 anal fin spines, 10 dorsal fin spines, and anus located near the anal fin origin.

Species
There are currently seven recognized species in this genus:
 Malakichthys barbatus Yamanoue & Yoseda, 2001
 Malakichthys elegans Matsubara & Yamaguti, 1943 – splendid seabass
 Malakichthys griseus Döderlein (de), 1883 – Silvergray seabass
 Malakichthys levis Yamanoue & Matsuura, 2002 – smooth seabass
 Malakichthys mochizuki Yamanoue & Matsuura, 2002 – Mochizuki's seabass
 Malakichthys similis Yamanoue & Matsuura, 2004
 Malakichthys wakiyae D. S. Jordan & C. L. Hubbs, 1925

References

 
Acropomatidae
Taxa named by Ludwig Heinrich Philipp Döderlein